Newmarket North Mall was a mall located in Hampton, Virginia that was developed by The Hahn Company and opened in 1975. Its three anchors were Leggett, Miller & Rhoads, and Sears.

In 1989, Goodman Segar Hogan bought the property and began a two-year, $9 million renovation and expansion project.  In 1990, when the renovation was nearly complete, the mall was renamed "Newmarket Fair."

Due to Patrick Henry Mall's opening in bordering Newport News, Virginia in 1987, Newmarket Fair languished, leaving Sears, which was among 235 properties Sears Holdings spun off in 2015 into Seritage Growth Properties, is the only remaining retail anchor tenant. However, on October 15, 2018 this location was announced as one of a number of stores closing as part of the Chapter 11 bankruptcy protection filing by Sears Holdings. The store ultimately closed on January 6, 2019.
There is one remaining retail establishment left, Piccadilly Cafeteria, which is the only remaining Piccadilly in Virginia.

References

External links
 Deadmalls.com write up on the mall
 NetCenter's webpage

Shopping malls established in 1975
Buildings and structures in Hampton, Virginia
Shopping malls in Virginia
Defunct shopping malls in the United States